Jeffery T. Kite-Powell is an American musicologist and Professor Emeritus at the Florida State University College of Music where he was active from 1984 to 2013. During his tenure at FSU, he was Coordinator of the Music History and Musicology Division from 1996 to 2008. He also directed The Florida State University Early Music Ensembles and in 1989 he founded the vocal group Cantores Musicæ Antiquæ. Kite-Powell’s primary focuses are the music of the Renaissance and early Baroque periods, organ tablature, historical performance practice, and Michael Praetorius.

Education 
Kite-Powell received the Bachelor of Music degree in clarinet performance in 1963 from the College-Conservatory of Music in Cincinnati and the Bachelor of Science in Music Education in 1964 from the University of Cincinnati. He earned the Master of Arts degree in Musicology from the University of New Mexico while serving in the U.S. Army at Sandia Base (1965-1968) and the Ph.D. in Musicology from the University of Hamburg, in Hamburg, Germany in 1976.

On Michael Praetorius 
Kite-Powell has written multiple articles based on his research of Michael Praetorius and published a translation of the 1619 treatise Syntagma Musicum III.

Michael Praetorius's Syntagma Musicum III, which focuses, in part, on performance practice of the period, is the third volume of his treatise Syntagma Musicum. This work provides insight into how music of this period was actually performed and is foundational to modern, historically informed performance. Kite-Powell's early music ensembles have performed multiple works by this composer, in a historically informed manner.

In his article Michael Praetorius: In His Own Words, Kite-Powell holds a hypothetical interview with Michael Praetorius. In this "interview," Kite-Powell outlines Praetorius's education, career, and contributions to musical theory and performance in an approachable, question and answer format. 

Kite-Powell's article Performance Forces and Italian Influence in Michael Praetorius's Syntagma Musicum III provides statistical information regarding Syntagma Musicum III. Kite-Powell uses this statistical information to illustrate Michael Praetorius's thinking process and the elements that influenced it.

On Hieronymus Praetorius 
In 1980, Kite-Powell published his two-volume book, "The Visby (Petri) organ tablature: investigation and critical edition" documenting his research of the tablature. Since The Visby (Petri) Tablature, which was written circa 1600, is the earliest surviving tablature of Hamburg origin, it is critically important to the investigation of organ music from Hamburg and Northern Germany during that era. According to Kite-Powell's book, Hieronymus Praetorius was the "most prolific and influential composer in North Germany" during this period. Among his many other contributions to organ music, Hieronymus Praetorius is credited with the founding of the organ tradition known as the "Hamburg School." Kite-Powell's book also covers the compositions of Jacob Praetorius contained within the tablature, which he notes are "of great significance," as well as the contributions of Johann Bahr. "Levavi oculos meos" à 10 by Hieronymus Praetorius as performed by the Florida State University Early Music Ensembles, performed on period instruments, and conducted by Kite-Powell on April 21, 2013 at St. John's Episcopal church, Tallahassee is an example of how Hieronymus Praetorius's work would have been performed in this period.

In July, 1995, Kite-Powell presented his paper entitled "The Hieronymus/Anonymous Question in the Visby (Petri) Tablature" at the Hamburg-Scandinavian Organ Festival in Hamburg, Germany. The Visby (Petri) Tablature itself documents three known contributors, Hieronymus Praetorius, his son Jacob Praetorius, and Johann Bahr as well as one anonymous composer. The "question" this paper addresses is that of the identity of the anonymous composer. There are "41 anonymous works—hymns, Kyries, Agnus Deis, and Sequences" contained within the tablature. Kite-Powell's research presented in his paper is aimed at unraveling this mystery.

Cantores Musicæ Antiquæ 
In 1989, Kite-Powell founded the vocal group Cantores Musicæ Antiquæ [Singers of Early Music] with the "goal of performing music from 1200-1650 in a historically informed manner." The group is generally made up of between eight and twelve singers. These singers are undergraduates, masters, and doctoral students with majors ranging from voice to musicology. The group has performed at regional and national conventions throughout the southeastern United States and has been broadcast on National Public Radio's Millennium of Music. Several of the works performed by these groups were performed for the first time since their seventeenth century premieres. Tomás Luis de Victoria’s Officium Defunctorum (Requiem Mass à 6) is the most listened to performance and has garnered numerous reviews.

Conference Presentations 
Kite-Powell was an invited lecturer at the "Götebord International Organ Academy" conference in Göteborg, Sweden, 1994, the "Hamburg-Scandinavian Organ Festival” conference in Hamburg, Germany, 1995, the "Instrumentälischer Bettlermantl Conference” at the University of Edinburgh in Edinburgh, Scotland, 1997, where he was the keynote speaker, the conference entitled "Michael Praetorius: Vermittler europäischer Musiktraditionen um 1600" in Wolfenbüttel, Germany, 2008, and the International Musicological Conference entitled "Syntagma Musicum 1619 ~ 2019" held in Ljubljana, Slovenia, 2019.

Principal Publications

Books 
 The Visby (Petri) organ tablature: investigation and critical edition
 The reconstruction of Hugo Leichsenring's dissertation Hamburgische Kirchenmusik im Reformationsaltar
 Syntagma Musicum III
 A Performer's Guide to Renaissance Music
 A Performer's Guide to Seventeenth-Century Music, Second Edition

Articles 
 The Hieronymus/Anonymous Question in the Visby (Petri) Tablature
 Michael Praetorius: In His Own Words
 Performance Forces and Italian Influence in Michael Praetorius's Syntagma Musicum III
 Michael Praetorius's Variable Opinions on Performance
 Notating--Accompanying--Conducting: Intabulation Usage in the Levoča Manuscripts
 Michael Praetorius's Organ works: The Notation Conundrum Revisited
 German Keyboard Tablature

Honors and awards 
 Early Music America's Thomas Binkley Award for Outstanding Achievement by a Collegium Director (2003)
 Festschrift - Hands-On" Musicology: Essays in Honor of Jeffery Kite-Powell

Professional Activities 

 Founding member and President of the Board of Directors of Early Music America (1998-2001)
 Member of the American Musicological Society
 Member of the Society of Seventeenth-Century Music (treasurer, 1997-1999)
 Member of the Southern Chapter of the American Musicological Society (president, 1992-1994)

Performances

Reception

See Also

Notes

References

External links 

 FSU Early Music Ensembles performances

1941 births
Living people
American musicologists
Baroque music
Florida State University faculty
Renaissance music
University of Cincinnati alumni
University of Cincinnati – College-Conservatory of Music alumni
University of Hamburg alumni
University of New Mexico alumni
Hieronymus Praetorius scholars
Michael Praetorius scholars